Mary-Frances Monroe (born February 7, 1980) is an American former soccer midfielder who played for Boston Breakers of Women's Professional Soccer and was a member of the United States women's national soccer team.

Following her professional career, Monroe went on to serve as head coach of the University of Albany women's soccer team and then, in May 2013, took on head coaching duties for the Miami Hurricanes Women's Soccer team at the University of Miami. Following the 2017 season she was relieved of her duties as head coach.

References

External links
 Boston Breakers player profile
 Boston Aztec player profile
 New England Mutiny player profile
 WUSA player profile
 UConn player profile
 UCLA player profile
 Albany coaching profile
 Mary-Frances Monroe at SoccerTimes.com

1980 births
Living people
United States women's international soccer players
Women's association football midfielders
UConn Huskies women's soccer players
UCLA Bruins women's soccer players
Parade High School All-Americans (girls' soccer)
People from West Islip, New York
Women's United Soccer Association players
Philadelphia Charge players
Boston Breakers (WUSA) players
New England Mutiny players
Boston Breakers players
American women's soccer players
American women's soccer coaches
Miami Hurricanes women's soccer coaches
Albany Great Danes women's soccer coaches
Expatriate women's footballers in Sweden
KIF Örebro DFF players
Damallsvenskan players
American expatriate sportspeople in Sweden
Boston Aztec (WPSL) players
Women's Premier Soccer League players
Women's Professional Soccer players
Long Island Rough Riders (USL W League) players
USL W-League (1995–2015) players